O-Acetylserine is an α-amino acid with the chemical formula HO2CCH(NH2)CH2OC(O)CH3.  It is an intermediate in the biosynthesis of the common amino acid cysteine in bacteria and plants.  O-Acetylserine is biosynthesized by acetylation of the serine by the enzyme serine transacetylase. The enzyme O-acetylserine (thiol)-lyase, using sulfide sources, converts this ester into cysteine, releasing acetate:
HO2CCH(NH2)CH2OH  →  HO2CCH(NH2)CH2OC(O)CH3
HO2CCH(NH2)CH2OC(O)CH3  →  HO2CCH(NH2)CH2SH

References

Amino acids
Acetate esters